Indra is a 2008 Indian Kannada-language action masala film starting Darshan and Namitha in the lead roles. The film is about a don's younger brother whose dreams for a normal life were shattered when his brother was killed along with his wife by 3 men. This made him seek vengeance for his brother's death. It is a remake of the 2003 Tamil film Arasu starring SarathKumar and Simran in lead roles.

Cast
Darshan as Rayanna and Indra
Namitha as Janaki 
Sanghavi
Ramesh Bhat
Anand Raj
Harish Raj
Avinash
Siddarth
Vinaya Prasad
Thimme Gowda as Ramashastry 
Anitharani
Sathyajith
Bullet Prakash
Kalpana
Sadashiva Brahmavar
Ganesh Rao
Mandeep Roy
Lochan

Soundtrack
The music was composed by V. Harikrishna and released by Ashwini Recording Company.

References

2000s Kannada-language films
2008 films
Kannada remakes of Tamil films
Indian action films
Indian films about revenge
2008 action films